The Battle of Apache Pass was fought in 1862 at Apache Pass, Arizona, in the United States, between Apache warriors and the Union volunteers of the California Column as it marched from California to capture Confederate Arizona and to reinforce New Mexico's Union army. It was one of the largest battles between the Americans and the Chiricahua during the Apache Wars.

Background
The 2500 men of the California Column traveled across the arid Southwest in staggered groups to allow water sources to replenish. In early 1862 Col. James H. Carleton sent units from Fort Yuma to Tucson, Arizona, which had recently been occupied by a Confederate force, Company A, Arizona Rangers. After a small engagement known as the Battle of Picacho Pass just north of Tucson between a detachment of Carleton's cavalry and Confederate pickets, the Union forces advanced on Tucson in three columns. They arrived in Tucson on May 20, forcing the heavily outnumbered Confederate garrison to withdraw to Texas without a fight.

After capturing Confederate Arizona's western outpost, Carleton prepared to march east with his main body in July, intending to enter New Mexico through Apache Pass in southeast Arizona. To prepare for the advance of his main force, he sent a column ahead as he had on his march from Yuma to Tucson. The column was led by Capt. Thomas L. Roberts of Company E, 1st California Infantry, accompanied by two 12-pounder mountain howitzers under the command of Sgt. James D. Monihon, a 22-man cavalry escort from Company B, 2nd Regiment California Volunteer Cavalry, led by Capt. John C. Cremony and 21 wagons plus 242 mules and horses.

After Roberts reached the San Pedro River, it became necessary to learn whether Dragoon Springs, 28 miles further east, could supply both companies with water or whether they would be forced to separate into smaller detachments. Capt. Roberts led the advance detachment with his infantry company, joined by three wagons, the howitzers and seven of Cremony's best horsemen to serve as scouts and couriers. Capt. Cremony remained behind with 15 cavalrymen and ten of Roberts' infantrymen, including the detachment left as a garrison at the river, where an adobe stage station building provided shelter and a defensive position to guard the remaining wagons and animals.

Roberts found the water at Dragoon Springs was enough to support the entire force, and Cremony joined with him the next day. Together they advanced on the springs at Apache Pass in the same manner, leaving Cremony with the guard detachment.

Battle
At noon on July 15, Roberts' detachment had just entered Apache Pass. After traveling about two-thirds of the way through, his force was attacked by about 500 Apache warriors led by Mangas Coloradas and Cochise (Geronimo claimed to have fought in this battle but this has not been confirmed).

The Union soldiers were not in a good situation. The infantrymen had walked dozens of miles across the hot Arizona desert, heading for the spring at Apache Pass, which was now blocked to them by the well-armed Chiricahua warriors. Low on water, and realizing a retreat back to Tucson without water could cost him many men, Roberts chose to fight. The Apaches had thrown up defenses, which consisted of several breastworks made of stone. They had also surprised the invaders with an ambush, waiting until the soldiers came within 30–80 yards of their positions before opening fire. Behind almost every mesquite tree and boulder hid an Apache with his rifle, six-shooter and knife. At first the Union troops could barely see their attackers. After a few minutes of intense combat Roberts ordered retreat, and his force withdrew to the mouth of Apache Pass. His men regrouped and unlimbered the mountain howitzers for an advance against the Apaches.

This was one of the first times the United States Army had been able to use artillery against the Indians in the Southwest. Roberts ordered his infantry to take the hills overlooking the pass, while he remained in the pass to direct the artillery support. The skirmishers moved forward, where they were able to take cover in an abandoned Butterfield Overland Mail station. The soldiers were now about 600 yards from the spring. Overlooking the spring were two hills, one on the east, the other on the south. The Apache riflemen behind the breastworks on the hills were delivering a deadly fire against the attackers.

Roberts advanced with his howitzers and had them open fire. Their effectiveness was limited by the fact that they were 300–400 feet below the Apache defenses. Roberts moved his guns ahead to a better position, all the time under heavy fire. Once the guns were in effective range, the artillery opened fire in earnest. The Apaches held their positions until nightfall, when they fled, allowing the Union troops to reach the spring. After allowing his tired men to enjoy a meal, Roberts retreated to bring up Cremony's detachment. The next morning the Apaches returned, but they fled once the artillery opened fire on them.

Aftermath
Two of Capt. Roberts' men were killed and three wounded in the battle for the spring. According to a report Col. Carleton made to Col. Richard C. Drum on September 20, 1862, about 10 Apaches were killed.

According to Capt. Cremony, however, a prominent Apache who was present in the engagement had said that 63 warriors were killed by the artillery, while only three died from small-arms fire. Said the unnamed Apache, "We would have done well enough if you had not fired wagons at us." The howitzers, being on wheels, were called wagons by the Apaches, who were unfamiliar with artillery tactics. Mangas Coloradas himself was wounded in the action, having been shot in the chest when attempting to kill one of Roberts' cavalry scouts.

One day after the battle, on the New Mexico side of Apache Pass, the bodies of nine scalped white civilians were found. Carleton decided that it was necessary to establish a post at the pass to prevent settlers from being ambushed as they passed through it. On August 4 the first units of the California Column reached Mesilla, New Mexico, along the Rio Grande. At the same time the last remnants of the Confederate army withdrew to Texas.

The 5th California Infantry was ordered to build a fort in Apache Pass, calling it Fort Bowie in honor of their colonel, George Washington Bowie. Carleton was placed in command of the Union's Department of New Mexico, and he continued to campaign against the Apaches in that area.

Today the battlefield and fort are preserved in Fort Bowie National Historic Site. The engagement was portrayed, somewhat inaccurately, in the 1952 film The Battle at Apache Pass.

See also
 New Mexico Campaign
 Bear Spring House, Guardhouse, and Spring

Notes

References
 
 Fort Bowie National Historic Site 
 Apache Indian War and Warriors
 Copeland, Peter F. – Southwest Indians Coloring Book. – Dover Publications. – .

External links
 National Park Service, Fort Bowie National Historic Site
 Battle of Apache Pass

Conflicts in 1862
Battles of the California Column of the American Civil War

Union victories of the American Civil War
Battles involving the Apache
Battles involving the United States
Battles of the American Civil War in Arizona
Events in Cochise County, Arizona
History of United States expansionism
19th-century military history of the United States
Battles of the Trans-Mississippi Theater of the American Civil War
Apache Wars
July 1862 events